Mount Pope Provincial Park is a provincial park in British Columbia, Canada, located 7km northwest of Fort St. James in the Omineca Country region of that province's Central Interior.  Mount Pope is about 1420 meters high and composed of limestone. The trail to the summit from Stones Bay Road gains about 700m and may be followed year-round. There are a few dozen developed rock climbs up to seven pitches long on the lower flanks of the mountain.

References
BC Parks webpage

External links

Provincial parks of British Columbia
Regional District of Bulkley-Nechako
Omineca Country
2001 establishments in British Columbia
Protected areas established in 2001